State Route 150, also known as the Mirror Lake Highway, is a state highway in the U.S. state of Utah. It is named for Mirror Lake, a picturesque lake that the highway passes along the way. It is also a USDA Forest Service Scenic Byway.

Route description
The highway begins at the intersection of Main Street (SR-32) and Center Street in Kamas and heads east on the latter as a two-lane undivided highway. Once exiting Kamas, the route dips southeast and continues as such until reaching Samak, where the road turns northeast briefly. Soon after, the highway turns south and southeast again. After continuing in a general southeast direction, the highway turns northeast and north and continues as such until reaching the Wyoming border south of Evanston.

During the winter months the road is closed to automobiles and is used by snowmobiles.

History
The state legislature designated SR-150 in 1933, running east from SR-35 (now SR-32) in Kamas to the Wasatch-Cache National Forest boundary. In 1953, it was extended east and north via Mirror Lake to the Wyoming state line.

Major intersections

References

External links
 Images from the Mirror Lake Highway in Utah
 Mirror Lake Highway information on Kamas Ranger District Website

 150
 150
 150

150
Features of the Uinta Mountains
150